Gankhuyagiin Nandinzayaa (born 27 June 1994) is a Mongolian sports shooter. She competed in the 50 m rifle 3 positions and 10 m air rifle events at the 2016 Summer Olympics and placed 9th and 14th, respectively. She won a gold and a bronze medal in these events at the 2018 Asian Games.

She took up shooting at age 13 following her father, Janchivdorj Gankhuyag, who was an international shooter and a shooting coach. She has a degree in international relations from the University of the Humanities, Ulaanbaatar.

References

External links
 

1994 births
Living people
Mongolian female sport shooters
Olympic shooters of Mongolia
Shooters at the 2016 Summer Olympics
Place of birth missing (living people)
Asian Games medalists in shooting
Shooters at the 2010 Asian Games
Shooters at the 2014 Asian Games
Shooters at the 2018 Asian Games
Medalists at the 2018 Asian Games
Asian Games gold medalists for Mongolia
Asian Games bronze medalists for Mongolia
21st-century Mongolian women